is a 1994 Japanese film. The film is based on the Japanese mythology, specifically the birth of Shinto.

Plot
The film begins with the birth of twin princes. Their father, the emperor of Yamato, feels a great loathing for his one child Ousu. Being convinced that this feeling is a premonition, the emperor orders the shaman Tsukinowa to kill the boy, yet his efforts are spoiled by Amano Shiratori, the White Bird of the Heavens. The emperor's sister, seeing this as a clear sign of divine intervention, takes it upon herself to raise the child. Years later, when the boy has matured into a man, he is given pardon by his father and allowed to return to the castle. However, not long after, his mother falls ill and dies mysteriously. This sends his brother into a rage and causes him to attack Ousu, who defends himself and kills his sibling in the process. His father, furious at these events, orders his son to leave the castle and not return until the barbarians living in the Kumaso domain are dealt with. The prince makes haste to complete this task, stopping off at a shrine on his way where, after a quick battle, he befriends a young priestess named Oto who joins him on his journey. They, along with companions Genbu and Seriyu, raid the castle, killing Kumaso Takeru and their god Kumasogami. Following this feat, the prince changes his name to Yamato Takeru, yet fails to win the acceptance of his father. His aunt, though, warns him of a great threat looming overhead, as the god Tsukuyomi is poised to return, endangering the Earth. Yamato Takeru must prepare to halt this from occurring. She tells him to bring the enchanted Sword of Dark Clouds to her for safekeeping as it holds a good deal of the god's power. He secures the sword but is tricked by the shaman Tsukinowa, revealed as Tsukuyomi's acolyte, into surrendering it, thus inadvertently restoring the evil lunar deity to full power. Tsukinowa also reveals that it was he who killed Ousu's mother and brother to frame Ousu. A full eclipse falls over earth as the moon god blots out the light of the sun. Takeru is told by the deity Susano'o that his divinely ordained destiny is to destroy Tsukuyomi with the aid of Oto, who is the incarnation of the sun goddess Amaterasu. Susano'o tests him by having him pull a sword from a stone, and tells him that it is the only weapon that can kill Tsukuyomi. Together, Takeru and Oto are transported to the moon to face the evil god, who transforms himself into Orochi, the legendary eight-headed dragon. The young heroes are joined by Amano Shiratori in the form of a giant white phoenix, and riding the bird they launch an aerial attack on the dragon. The battle appears impossible and at one point it seems they have both lost their lives, but Oto, taking Takeru's hand, dissolves into light and gives him her life energy. He realizes that the prophecy - that he would become a warrior of the gods once he possessed three lights - has come true, as he now has the shrine mirror, the enchanted sword, and the solar light of Oto's spirit. Takeru transforms into a gigantic golden-armored warrior named Utsuno Ikusagami, who fights and defeats the dragon. When Tsukuyomi falls, Oto is restored to life. Susano'o again appears and tells him to seal the moon god's spirit into his comma-shaped jewel, then cast it into the sky. The eclipse ends and the sun again shines on earth. As Takeru and Oto mount the White Bird to fly home to Earth, Takeru's father says he wants to see his son.

Release
Orochi, the Eight-Headed Dragon was distributed theatrically by Toho in Japan on 9 July 1994.

The film was released in the United States as Orochi the Eight-Headed Dragon directly to home video by A.D. Vision with an English dub on June 13, 1999. The film was reissued in Japanese with English subtitles in 2003.

Reception
Robert Firsching of AllMovie awarded the film three and a half stars out of five, stating that "the film is firmly in the province of magical fantasy, and is quite a good example of the form." describing it as a "really fun picture" that really stood out with its "wide-eyed innocence. Many films attempt to capture the look and feel of 1960s fantasy, but most fall prey to '90s cynicism and can't quite pull off the necessarily naïve belief in heroism and the power of goodness and purity to save mankind, or even that the belief that mankind is worth saving. This film does, and that alone makes it a refreshing throwback, and a great way to spend a Saturday afternoon."

See also
Yamato Takeru (anime)

References

Footnotes

Sources

External links
 

1994 films
1994 fantasy films
1990s monster movies
Japanese fantasy adventure films
Films about dragons
Sword and sorcery films
Toho tokusatsu films
Kaiju films
Giant monster films
Films directed by Takao Okawara
Films with screenplays by Wataru Mimura
Films based on Japanese myths and legends
Shinto in popular culture
1990s Japanese films